Ice hockey was introduced to the Olympic Games at the 1920 Summer Olympics in Antwerp.  The tournament also served as the first World Championships. The matches were played between April 23 and April 29, 1920. Canada, represented by the Winnipeg Falcons, won the gold medal. The silver went to the United States and Czechoslovakia took the bronze.

Summary
The organizing committee for the hockey matches included Paul Loicq, the captain of the Belgian team and a future president of the Ligue Internationale de Hockey sur Glace (LIHG). The games used the Canadian ice hockey rules, and the Bergvall system to determine medal winning teams.

The Canadian Amateur Hockey Association (CAHA) chose the Winnipeg Falcons as the 1920 Allan Cup champions to represent the Canada men's national team, instead of forming a national all-star team on short notice. Canada's manager W. A. Hewitt, introduced the CAHA rules of play to the LIHG at the Olympics. Writer Andrew Podnieks described Hewitt's interpretation of the rules as "competitive yet gentlemanly", and that the rules of play were accepted for Olympic hockey. Hewitt refereed the first Olympic hockey game played, an 8–0 win by the Sweden men's national team versus the Belgium men's national team, on April 23, 1920.

All matches took place in the Palais de Glace d'Anvers (ice palace of Antwerp). All games were played with seven players per side, with the rover position being used. For the duration of each match no substitutions were permitted and if a player exited the game due to injury the opposing team was forced to take a player out as well. Additional differences from modern play included a prohibition on forward passing and the requirement that all players including the goaltender be standing on his skates to play the puck. The duration of each game was two periods of twenty minutes each. Any game tied at the end of forty minutes would be extended by two periods of five minutes each, not sudden death. If tied at the end of fifty minutes, this process would repeat—and repeat as many times as needed until a winner is declared.

This was the first ice hockey tournament at an Olympic Games, and the only ever instance of it at a Summer Olympics. An ice hockey tournament was part of the inaugural Winter Olympics in 1924 and has been part of every Winter program since then.

Medalists

Participating nations

A total of 60 ice hockey players from 7 nations competed at the Antwerp Games:

Format
Seven nations entered teams in the inaugural Olympic ice hockey tournament. The tournament format used the Bergvall system, starting with an elimination round to determine the gold medal winner, after which teams that lost to the tournament winner would play through a new bracket to determine silver. Finally, teams which lost to either the gold or silver winners would face off in a third bracket to determine the bronze winner. For the gold medal round, teams were drawn into the bracket with France receiving a bye to the semifinals.

At the time of draw, the Swedish team questioned how the matchups for the later rounds would be determined and it was believed that teams advancing further in the earlier round would receive a bye. However, no decision was made and when it came time for the silver medal round Sweden and the United States were selected to play a semifinal game while Czechoslovakia received the bye. Later for the bronze medal round, organizers wanted to ensure the tournament would conclude on schedule but were reluctant to force the Czechoslovakians to play twice in one day. As a result, the Swedish team were made to play another semifinal game which would be their fourth in as many days with the bronze medal game the following day. This led to criticism of the format despite Bergvall later noting that the system was not used correctly.

Gold medal round (premier prix)

Bracket

Quarterfinals

Semifinals

Gold medal game

Silver medal round (second prix)

Bracket

Semifinal

Silver medal game

Bronze medal round (troisième prix)

Bracket

Semifinal

Bronze medal game

Statistics

Average age
Team France was the oldest team in the tournament, averaging 32 years and 11 months. Gold medalists team Canada was the youngest team in the tournament, averaging 24 years and 5 months. Tournament average was 26 years and 9 months.

Scoring leaders

Source: olympedia.org

Final ranking

References

Sources

External links
 1920 Olympic Games report (digitized copy online)
 International Olympic Committee results database
 Ishockey VM OS 1920-1939
 Olympedia Olympic results database

 
Olympics, Summer
1920 Summer Olympics events
1920
1920
Discontinued sports at the Summer Olympics
1924
April 1920 sports events